The third season of RuPaul's Drag Race began airing on January 24, 2011. Thirteen drag queens competed for the title of "America's Next Drag Superstar", a headlining spot on the Absolut Tour, a lifetime supply of Kryolan makeup, and a cash prize of $75,000.

This season had Michelle Visage replacing Merle Ginsberg at the judge's table and Billy Brasfield (better known as Billy B), Mike Ruiz, and Jeffrey Moran filling in for Santino Rice's absence during several episodes. Billy B, celebrity makeup artist and star of the HGTV mini-series Hometown Renovation, appeared as a judge in five episodes. Whereas Mike Ruiz only judged for two episodes, and Jeffrey Moran for one, Moran only appeared for promotional reasons. Due to Billy B's continued appearances, he and Rice are now considered to have been alternate judges for the same seat at the judges table, both appearing side-by-side in the reunion special to announce Yara Sofia as the season's Miss Congeniality.

Other changes made included the introduction of a wildcard contestant from the past season, Shangela; an episode with no elimination; and a contestant, Carmen Carrera, being brought back into the competition after having been eliminated a few episodes prior. A new pit crew was also introduced consisting of Jason Carter and Shawn Morales.

The theme song playing during the runway every episode was changed to "Champion" while the song playing during the credits is "Main Event", both from RuPaul's album Champion. As with the previous season, each week's episode was followed by a behind-the-scenes show, RuPaul's Drag Race: Untucked. On December 6, 2011 Amazon.com released this season on DVD via their CreateSpace program.

The winner of the third season of RuPaul's Drag Race was Raja, with Manila Luzon being the runner-up.

Contestants

Ages, names, and cities stated are at time of filming.

Notes:

Contestant progress

Lip syncs
Legend:

Guest judges
Listed in chronological order:

Bruce Vilanch, comedy writer, songwriter, and actor
Mike Ruiz, photographer, director, and reality television personality
Vanessa Williams, actress, singer, and former Miss America
Lily Tomlin, actress and comedian
Alessandra Torresani, actress
La Toya Jackson, singer
Susan Powter, motivational speaker and fitness guru
Chloë Sevigny, actress and model
Debbie Matenopoulos, television host
Aisha Tyler, comedian and actress
Amber Rose, model
Eliza Dushku, actress
Sara Rue, actress
Rita Rudner, comedian
Arden Myrin, comedian
Cheryl Tiegs, model
Johnny Weir, professional figure skater
Jeffrey Moran, Absolut Vodka marketing/branding executive
Jody Watley, R&B/pop singer
Carmen Electra, actress
Wayne Brady, actor, comedian, and singer
Fantasia Barrino, singer, actress, and author
Margaret Cho, actress and comedian
Sharon Osbourne, television host and reality television personality
Gigi Levangie, novelist and host of Logo's The Arrangement

Episodes

Ratings

1Based upon point/share system for Nielsen ratings. The first number represents the percentage of households within the population viewing the program (known as points). The second number (known as shares) is how many households were expected to view the program, within the population. For example, Episode 8 has a point/share of "0.3/1". This means .3% of households viewed the program from the expected 1%, showing .7% of the show's audience were watching a different program.

Controversy

Raja's win leaked 
Half way through the seasons airing, blogger Perez Hilton revealed Raja as the winner to the public, causing an uproar from fans. It also led to the show's crowning format being changed, with the finale taped with three different outcomes declaring each finalist as "the winner", with only RuPaul knowing who really wins and the true outcome being announced on the day of the final in attempt to conceal the winner's identity and prevent any spoilers from taking place. This took place from the following season-onwards.

References

External links
  (U.S.)
  (Canada)
 Official Facebook page

2011 American television seasons
2011 in LGBT history
Internet leaks
RuPaul's Drag Race seasons